Julie Thacker Scully (born January 1960) is an American television writer. She has written for The Simpsons, and along with her husband The Simpsons writer and producer Mike Scully she has co-created The Pitts and Complete Savages and is the co-creator of Duncanville.



Writing credits

The Simpsons episodes
She has written the following episodes:
"The Old Man and the 'C' Student" (1999)
"Last Tap Dance in Springfield" (2000)
"I'm Goin' to Praiseland" (2001)

Duncanville episodes
She has written the following episodes:
 "Pilot" (2020)
 "Red Head Redemption" (2020)
 "Sister, Wife" (2020)
 "Jack's Pipe Dream" (2020)
 "Judge Annie" (2020)
 "Free Range Children" (2020)
 "Das Banana Boot" (2021)
 "Duncan's New Word" (2021)
 "Who's Vrooming Who?" (2021)
 "Annie Oakie" (2021)
 "Witch Day 3" (2022)

References

External links

1960 births
Living people
American television writers
American women television writers
Place of birth missing (living people)
21st-century American women